This is a list of Chinese football transfers for the 2014 season summer transfer window. Only moves from Super League and League One are listed. The transfer window will be opened from 7 July 2014 to 31 July 2014.

Super League

Beijing Guoan

In:

 

Out:

Changchun Yatai

In:

 

Out:

Dalian Aerbin

In:

Out:

Guangzhou Evergrande

In:

Out:

Guangzhou R&F

In:
 

Out:

Guizhou Renhe

In:

Out:

Hangzhou Greentown

In:

Out:

Harbin Yiteng

In:

Out:

Henan Jianye

In:

Out:

Jiangsu Sainty

In:

 

Out:

Liaoning Whowin

In:

Out:

Shandong Luneng

In:

Out:

Shanghai Greenland

In:

Out:

Shanghai Shenxin

In:

Out:

Shanghai SIPG

In:

Out:

Tianjin Teda

In:

Out:

League One

Beijing Baxy

In:

 

Out:

Beijing Technology

In:

 

Out:

Chengdu Tiancheng

In:

 

 

Out:

Chongqing Lifan

In:

 

Out:

Guangdong Sunray Cave

In:

Out:

Hebei Zhongji 

In:

Out:

Hunan Billows

In:

 
 

Out:

Qingdao Hainiu

In:

Out:

Qingdao Jonoon

In:

Out:

Shenyang Zhongze

In:

 

Out:

Shenzhen Ruby

In:

Out:

Shijiazhuang Yongchang

In:

 

Out:

Tianjin Songjiang

In:

Out:

Wuhan Zall

In:

 

Out:

Xinjiang Tianshan Leopard 

In:

Out:

Yanbian Changbaishan

In:

Out:

References

China
2014
2014 in Chinese football